Mimeugoa is a monotypic moth genus of the family Erebidae. Its only species, Mimeugoa bifasciata, is found in Simla, Pakistan. Both the genus and species were first described by George Hampson, the genus in 1895 and the species a year earlier in 1894.

References

Calpinae
Monotypic moth genera